Donald Paul Schneider (April 3, 1923 – July 13, 2009) was an American football player who played at the halfback position. He played college football for Penn and professional football for the Buffalo Bills.

Early years
Schneider was born in 1923 in Crafton, Pennsylvania. He attended and played football at J. P. McCaskey High School in Lancaster, Pennsylvania. He graduated from McCaskey in 1942. The Lancaster New Era in 1944 described him as "one of the finest backs ever developed at McCaskey High." He was also a star sprinter in high school.

College football and military service
Schneider enrolled at the University of Pennsylvania in 1942 and played on the freshman football team. His college career was interrupted by service in the United States Army Air Forces from December 1942 through February 1945. He was an aerial gunner. He also played college football for Penn from 1945 to 1947. As a senior, he was a member of the undefeated 1947 Penn Quakers football team that was ranked No. 7 in the final AP Poll. He also played varsity baseball for three years at Penn.

Professional football
He was selected by the Chicago Bears in the fifth round (34th overall pick) of the 1946 NFL Draft but did not play for the Bears. He played for the Buffalo Bills of the All-America Football Conference (AAFC) during their 1948 season and appeared in nine games. He was a starter on defense and a reserve player on offense.

Family and later years
After one year of pro football, he served as a high school football coach at various schools in Pennsylvania and New Jersey from 1949 to 1950. He also taught English and physical education. From 1960 to 1962, he was an assistant football coach at Lehigh University. He was a teacher and coach at Watching Hills (NJ) Regional High School from 1962 to 1969 and assistant principal until 1971. He was then a principal in schools in the Philadelphia area from 1971 to 1983. 

In 1993, Schneider was inducted into the Susquehanna Valley chapter of the Pennsylvania Sports Hall of Fame. He died in 2009 in West Chester, Pennsylvania, at age 86.

References

1923 births
2009 deaths
Buffalo Bills (AAFC) players
Penn Quakers football players
Players of American football from Pennsylvania
People from Crafton, Pennsylvania
American football halfbacks
United States Army Air Forces personnel of World War II
United States Army Air Forces soldiers